Sean Michael Callahan is a retired American professional soccer player who played professionally in the USL A-League and World Indoor Soccer League.

In 1996, Callahan graduated from Jesuit High School.  He attended Santa Clara University, playing on the men’s soccer team from 1996 to 1999, participating in 1998 & 1999 Final Fours, reaching the National Championship vs. Indiana in 1999.  He led the nation in assists his senior season.  Callahan turned professional in 2000 with the Sacramento Knights of the World Indoor Soccer League.  He moved outdoors in 2001 with the Atlanta Silverbacks of the USL A-League.  In 2002, Callahan moved to the Rochester Rhinos, but went on loan to the Hampton Roads Mariners for most of the season.  On April 3, 2003, Callahan signed with the Seattle Sounders.  He retired from professional soccer after the 2004 season, but spent one season with the fourth division Sacramento Knights of the amateur National Premier Soccer League in 2006.  The Knights won the league championship that season. champs. Sean-Michael is married with five children and is now a procurement/finance executive.

External links
 Placer United: Sean Michael Callahan

References

Living people
1975 births
American soccer players
Atlanta Silverbacks players
Virginia Beach Mariners players
Rochester New York FC players
Sacramento Knights players
Sacramento Knights (NPSL) players
Santa Clara Broncos men's soccer players
Seattle Sounders (1994–2008) players
A-League (1995–2004) players
World Indoor Soccer League players
Association football midfielders